This is a list of magicians/illusionists, prestidigitators, mentalists, escapologists, and other practitioners of stage magic. For the list of supernatural magicians, see List of occultists.

Magicians are listed by the most common name used in performance. Magicians' actual names, when applicable, follow in parentheses.

A

 Aalto, Simo
 Abbot, David
 Acer, David
 Ackerman, Allan
 Adams, Curtis
 Aich, Jewel
 Alexander, C. A. (Claude Alexander Conlin)
 Alexander, Jason
 Alexander, Jay
 Amazing Johnathan (John Edward Szeles)
 Ammar, Michael
 Amodei, Ivan
 Anckorn, Fergus ("Wizardus")
 Anderson, Harry
 Anderson, John Henry
 Andrus, Jerry
 Andruzzi, Tony (Tom S. Palmer)
 Angel, Criss (Christopher Sarantakos)
 Annemann, Theodore (Theodore John Squires)
 Archer, John
 Aronson, Simon
 Atkins, Jeffery

B

 Baker, Al
 Balducci, Ed
 Baldwin, Samri
 Ballantine, Carl (Meyer Kessler)
 Bamberg II, David Tobias (Fu Manchu)
 Bamberg, Tobias
 Banachek (Steven Shaw)
 Barry and Stuart (Barry Jones & Stuart MacLeod)
 Barry, Keith
 Bartl, János
 Bavli, Guy
 Becker, Herbert L.
 Ben, David
 Berglas, David
 Bertram, Charles
 Frank K. Berry
 Biere, Arnold de
 Black, Ariann
 Blackstone, Gay
 Blackstone, Harry, Sr.
 Blackstone, Harry, Jr.
 Blaine, David
 Bobo, J.B.
 Bongo, Ali (William Oliver Wallace)
 Born, John
 Branson, L. H.
 Brodien, Marshall
 Dick Brooks (entertainer) also known as Dick Brookz, Bravo the Great or Grate, and Ray Carter (John Bravo)
 Brown, Derren
 Brown, James
 Brushwood, Brian
 Buchinger, Matthias
 Burger, Eugene
 Burton, Lance
 Burlingame, H. J.
 Bux, Kuda (Khuda Bakhsh)

C

 Cagliostro, Alessandro
 Calvert, John (Elbern Madren Calvert)
 Cameron, Charles
 Canuplin (Canuto Francia)
 Carbonaro, Michael
 Cardini (Richard Valentine Pitchford)
 Carlyle, Francis (Francis Xavier Finneran)
 Carnegie, Dean
 Carney, John
 Carter, Charles Joseph
 Cassidy, John
 Caveney, Mike
 Chen, Juliana
 Chen, Lu
 Shamsudheen Cherpulassery from Kerala, India
 Christopher, Milbourne
 Coby, Rudy
 Cohen, Al
 Cohen, Steve
 Colombini, Aldo
 Comte, Louis
 Comus (Ledru, Nicolas-Philippe)
 Cook, Ali
 Cooper, Tommy
 Copperfield, David (David Seth Kotkin)
 Corinda, Tony (Thomas William Simpson)
 Cox, Chris
 Crowley, Aleister (Edward Alexander Crowley)
 Culpitt, Fred
 Cunningham, Doc
 Curry, Paul

D

 Daniels, Paul (Newton Edward Daniels)
 Dante the Magician (Harry August Jansen)
 Daryl (Daryl Easton, Daryl Martinez)
 Davenport, Lewis (George Ryan)
 Davenport, William Henry and Erastus, Ira
 Dedi
 de Vère, Clémentine
 De Kolta, Buatier
 Devant, David (David Wellington or David Wighton)
 Diaconis, Persi
 Dietrich, Dorothy
 Dill, Dean
 Dingle, Derek
 Dinardi (Alfred Körber)
 Downs, Thomas Nelson
 Drake, Simon (Simon Alexander)
 Draper, Paul W.
 Dunninger, Joseph
 Durham, Geoffrey
 Dynamo (Steven Frayne)

E

 Eason, Doc
 Eliason, Frank Eugene
 Eliason, Oscar
 Ellis, Tim
 Elmsley, Alex
 Erdnase, S. W.
 Erkin, Sermet
 Evans, Henry R.
 Evans, Sophie
 Evanswood, Terry

F

 Fakir of Ava (Isaiah Harris Hughes)
 Farla, Christian
 Farquhar, Shawn
 Ferguson, Rich (Richard Jeffrey Evans)
 Ferré, Norbert
 Finney, Michael
 Finch, Jon
 Firman, Pete
 Fischbacher, Siegfried, see Siegfried & Roy
 Fitzkee, Dariel (Dariel Fitzroy)
 Flom, Justin
 Flosso, Al (Albert Levinson)
 Foo, Ching Ling (Chee Ling Qua)
 Fox, Imro (Isidore Fuchs)
 Franco, Mat  (Mat Franco)
 Freedman, James
 Freer, Winston
 Frewin, Greg
 Frischman, Dan

G
 
 Guimaraes, Helder
 Ganson, Lewis
 Garcia, Frank
 Gardner, Martin
 Gazzo (Gary Osbourne)
 Germain, Karl
 Gertner, Paul
 Gibson, Walter B.
 Giobbi, Roberto
 Gladwin, Andi
 Green, Lennart
 Goldenberg, Haim 
 Goldin, Horace
 Goldston, Will
 Gopinath Muthukad
 Gore, Steve
 Gunawan, Hendra

H

 Harary, Franz
 Hamman, Br. John
 Hammer, Virginia Edmunda
 Hardeen (Ferencz Dezso Weisz)
 Harris, Neil Patrick
 Harris, Paul
 Hatfield, Murray and Teresa
 Haydn, Whit "Pop"
 Heath, Royal Vale 
 Henning, Doug
 Herrmann, Alexander
 Hilliard, John Northern
 Houdini, Harry (Erik Weiss)
 Hugard, Jean
 Han Ping Chien
 Hyde, Timothy

I

 Interrante, Scott
 Işınbark, Ertuğrul

J

 James, Kevin
 James, P. (V. Kennedy)
 Jarrow, Emil
 Jay, Joshua
 Jay, Ricky (Ricky Potash)
 Jennings, Larry
 Jermay, Luke
 John George
 Jillette, Penn, see also Penn & Teller
 Johnson, Kristen
 Jonathan, The Amazing (John Edward Szeles)
 Jones, Barry
 Jordan, Charles

K

 Kane, Peter
 Kaps, Fred (Abraham Pieter Adrianus Bongers)
 Katterfelto, Gustavus
 Kellar, Harry (Heinrich Keller)
  Kent, Michael
 Kieve, Paul
 King, Mac
 Kio, Emil (Emil Teodorovich Girshfeld-Renard)
 Kio, Igor (Igor Emilievich Renard Kio)
 Klok, Hans
 Knauss, Eric (The Great Zucchini)
 Kole, André (Robert Gurtler, Jr.)
 De Kolta, Buatier (Joseph Bautier)
 Koran, Al (Edward Doe)
 Milton Kort
 Kredible, Justin (Justin Willman)
 The Amazing Kreskin (George Joseph Kresge, Jr.)
 Kwong, David

L

 Labero, Joe (Lars Bengt Roland Johansson)
 Laflin, Duane
 Lancaster, Lou (Louis Lancaster McClung)
 Latimer, Jason
 Lee, Misty
 Leifer, Debbie
 Lenert, Tina
 Lenier, Minnette Gersh
 Le Roy, Servais
 Levi, Eliphas (Alphonse Louis Constant)
 Levit, Jonathan
 Lim, Shin 
 Lorayne, Harry
 Lovell, Curtis II
 Lovell, Simon
 Lovick, John
 London, Tom
 Lal, K (Kantilal Girdharilal Vora)

M

 MacGregor, John
 Macleod, Stuart
 Magic Babe Ning (Ning Cai)
 Mahdi Moudini
 Magic Christian (Christian Stelzel)
 Majax, Gérard (Gérard Fater)
 Malini, Max (Max Katz Breit)
 Malone, Bill
 Mandrake, Leon (Leon Giglio)
 Marcy, Matt
 Marlo, Ed (Edward Malkowski)
 Marshall, Jay (James Ward Marshall)
 Marvey, Peter
 Maskelyne, Jasper
 Maskelyne, John Nevil
 Maskelyne, Nevil
 Masklyn ye Mage: see Tony Andruzzi
 de Matos, Luis
 Matt the Knife
 Maven, Max (Phil Goldstein)
 Mayne, Andrew (Andrew Harter)
 McBride, Jeff
 McComb, Billy
 McKenzie, Doug
 Méliès, Georges (Marie-Georges-Jean Méliès)
 Menna, Lisa
 Milner, John
 Minkin, David
 Money-Coutts, Drummond
 Morgan The Escapist
 Mulhern, Stephen
 Mulholland, John
 Mullica, Tom
 Munoz, Oscar
 Muthukad, Gopinath

N

 Namboothiri, Vazhakkunnam
 Neutert, Natias
 Nicholson, Chris
 Nixon, David
 Nova, Aldo
 Nu, Alain
 Nyman, Andy

O

 Ogawa, Shoot
 Okito (Tobias Bamberg)
 Orleans, Danny
 Ortiz, Darwin
 Osterlind, Richard
 Ovette, Great (Joseph Ovette)
 Özdemir, İlkay
 O.P. Sharma

P

 Page, Pat
 Palladino, Eusapia (Minerverno Murge)
 Palmer, Johnny "Ace"
 Paterson, Alex
 Pearlman, Oz
 Pendragons (Jonathan and Charlotte Pendragon)
 Penn, David
 Penn & Teller (see also Penn Jillette and Teller)
 Penrose, Scott
 Philadelphia, Jacob (Jacob Meyer)
 Pinetti, Joseph (Joseph Pinetti Willedall de Merci)
 Polgar, Franz
 Pollock, Channing
 Potter, Richard
 Presto, Fay (Letitia Winter, Oliver Winter)
 P. C. Sorcar Sr. (Indian magician, 1950s)
 P. C. Sorcar Jr. and P. C. Sorcar, Young (Indian Magicians)

Q
 Qualter, Noel

R

 Randi, James (Randall James Hamilton Zwinge)
 Reveen, Peter
 Reynolds, Charles
 Robert, Étienne-Gaspard
 Robert-Houdin, Jean Eugène
 Robinson, William Ellsworth: see Chung Ling Soo
 Role, Brian
 Romany, the Diva of Magic
 Roth, David
 Rovi (Ivor Parry)
 Rowland, Ian

S

 Sadowitz, Jerry
 Salwak, Dale
 Sam, Long Tack (Lung Te Shan)
 Sankey, Jay
 Saville, Ian
 Saxe, Melinda
 SawChuck, Murray
 Scarne, John (Orlando Carmelo Scarnecchia)
 Schindler, George
 Schmidt, Pauline
 Schwarzman, Howie
 Scott & Muriel (Scott Nelson and Muriel Brugman)
 Seeman, Baron Hartwig
 Selbit, P. T. (Percy Thomas Tibbles)
 Setteducati, Mark
 Shaxon, Alan (Alan Arthur Howson)
 Sheridan, Jeff
 Shokyokusai, Tenkatsu (Madame Tenkatsu)
 Siegfried & Roy (Siegfried Fischbacher and Roy Horn)
 Silano, Rocco
 Silvan (Aldo Savoldello)
 Aaron Smith
 Slydini, Tony (Quintino Marucci)
 Solomon, Thomas
 Soo, Chung Ling (William Ellsworth Robinson)
 Sorcar, P. C. (Protul Chandra Sarcar)
 Sorcar, P. C. Jr. (Prodip Chandra Sarcar)
 Steinmeyer, Jim
 Stone, David
 Stone, Tom (Thomas Bengtsson)
 Strebler, Morgan (Matthew Glenn Milligan)
 Sum, J C (Sum Jan-chung)
 Suhani Shah (India)
 Sungur, Zati
 Swiss, Jamy Ian
 Sylvester the Jester (Daniel Sylvester Battagline)

T

 Takayama, Cyril
 Talma, Mercedes (Mary Ann Ford)
 Tamariz, Juan (Tamariz-Martel Negrón)
 Tarbell, Harlan
 Thompson, Johnny (The Great Tomsoni)
 Teller (Raymond Joseph Teller): see also Penn & Teller
 Tempest, Marco
 Tenko, Princess (Mariko Itakura)
 Thurston, Howard
 Timon, Margo (Margo Tucker)
 Tobin, Neil
 Topas
 Turner, Richard

V

 Valentino, Val (The Masked Magician)
 Andrew Van Buren
 Vernon, Dai (David Frederick Wingfield Verner)
 Vincent, Michael (Michael Vincent Louis)

W

 Walker, Val
 Walton, Roy
 Watson, Alan
 Wayne, Matt (Matthew Wayne Tomasko)
 Webster, Sue-Anne
 Welles, Orson
 Willard, Frances
 Williams, Dick
 Wilson, Gregory
 Wilson, Mark
 Wilson, R. Paul
 Wind, Tommy
 Witt, Wittus (Hans-Günter Witt)
 Wonder, Tommy (Jacobus Maria Bemelman)
 Wood, Dominic
 Wood, Greg
 Wyrick, Steve

Z

 Zabrecky, Rob
 Zamloch, Anton
 The Zancigs
 Zarrow, Herb
 Zenon, Paul
 Zimmer, Florian

See also
 List of magicians in film

References

Magicians